The 3rd Air Command (Serbo-Croatian: 3. vazduhoplovna komanda/ 3.  ваздухопловна команда) was a joint unit of Yugoslav Air Force.

History
It was established by the order from June 27, 1959, on November 23, same year per the "Drvar" reorganization plan of Yugoslav Air Force from the 39th Aviation Division with command at Batajnica. In 1961 it suffered a change inorganization.

By the new "Drvar 2" reorganization plan of Yugoslav Air Force, 3rd Air Command has been disbanded. Its units were attached to 1st Aviation Corps.

The commanders of Air command was Nikola Lekić.

Organization

1959-1961
1st Air Command
103rd Signal Battalion
Liaison Squadron of 3rd Air Command
Light Combat Aviation Squadron of 3rd Air Command
94th Fighter Aviation Regiment
198th Fighter-Bomber Aviation Regiment
81st Fighter-Bomber Aviation Regiment
107th Fighter-Bomber Aviation Regiment
116th Fighter Aviation Regiment (1959-1960)
161st Air Base
165th Air Base

1961-1964
1st Air Command
103rd Signal Battalion
461st Light Combat Aviation Squadron
94th Fighter Aviation Regiment
198th Fighter-Bomber Aviation Regiment
81st Support Aviation Regiment
107th Helicopter Regiment
161st Air Base
165th Air Base

Headquarters
Skoipski Petrovac

Commanding officers 
Colonel Dušan Vlaisavljević

References 
Notes and citations

Bibliography
 

Air Commands of Yugoslav Air Force
Military units and formations established in 1959